Bulbophyllum pahudii is a species of orchid in the genus Bulbophyllum. It can be found in Java, at a minimum elevation of 850 meters and is very rare. It was first discovered in 1883. This species of orchid has a very bad smell but is very beautiful. Bulbophyllum pahudii flowers are over 4" tall.

References
The Bulbophyllum-Checklist
The Internet Orchid Species Photo Encyclopedia
https://www.orchidsforum.com/threads/bulbophyllum-pahudii.8403/

pahudii